Ramon Nomar is a Venezuelan-born Spanish pornographic actor. He started his pornographic career around the age of 23, and he has worked with pornographic film producers Reality Kings, Brazzers and New Sensation.

Nomar got his first break in hardcore with the Italian director Luca Damiano, who organized a casting at the Barcelona International Erotic Film Festival. Nomar eventually broke into both the European and U.S. industries. He is one of the most popular actors in the porn industry. He has stated in the past that he had always been in favor of well-scripted features as opposed to gonzo pornography, although he had no objections to appearing in films of either style.

Early life

Nomar was born in Caracas, Venezuela, where he spent the first years of his life. His family soon moved to Barcelona, Spain, and he grew up in A Coruña. He was a restless and creative boy, he built his first bicycle himself, searching for parts in various junkyards. From an early age he showed a reluctance to learn. At 16, he wanted to become a porn actor and was fascinated by Rocco Siffredi's films. He started working in the events department of A Coruña, where he hung posters on the street. He also worked as a waiter. He completed the nine-month service in the Navy in the Canary Islands. In 1994, at the age of 21, he started working in a local sex shop, where, in addition to running the store, he also ran a peep-show for a year.

Career

Beginnings
In September 1995, Nomar traveled to Barcelona for the International Erotic Film Festival, where, at age 23, he won a casting organized by Italian director Luca Damiano. The participants had to have sex on a Poble Espanyol stage in front of an audience of around 2,000 spectators. Two weeks later, he made his first movie with Luca Damiano: Cindy with Selen. Shortly after, she starred in the José María Ponce production Showgirls in Madrid (IFG, 1996) as Guanche alongside Nina Hartley (Julie Adams), Max Cortés (Chinese), Toni Ribas (Toni Navarro) and Hakan Serbes (Michel).

At the beginning of his career, Nomar was simply known by his given name Ramón or Guevara. Luca Damiano cast him in his high-budget pornographic films, including the role of John the Baptist in the Oscar Wilde Salomé tragedy pastiche - Salomé (1997), Fucking Instinct (1997), The Night porter - Il Portiere di notte (1998), like Frank in a parody of the 1960s Western The Magnificent Seven: Rocco and the Magnific Seven (Rocco ei magnifici 7, 1998) and 1954's Seven Samurai: Rocco and the Mercenaries (Rocco ei mercenari, 1999) with Rocco Siffredi, in the role of General Barras in Napoleone - Le Amanti dell'Imperatore (1998) with Roberto Malone and in the role of Sergey Zodomir in Anastasia - AnaXtasia - La principessa stuprata (1998).

During a time, Nomar worked in erotic shows at the Baghdad Party Hall in Barcelona, where erotic artists who had become world-renowned rose to fame.

Rise to prominence in Europe
In 1998, at the Cannes Erotic Film Festival, Nomar received the Hot d'Or award for Best Newcomer. In 1999 he returned to Cannes to award a Lifetime Achievement Award for Hustler to Larry Flynt. He participated in photo shoots, often with Andrea Moranty and Toni Ribas. He also appeared in the movies: Anita Dark Forever (1999) with Anita Dark, Gothix (2000) with Chipy Marlow and Nosferatu (2002) with Melinda Gale.

On two occasions, in the category "Best Spanish actor", Nomar was distinguished with the Ninfa Award at the International Erotic Film Festival of Barcelona; in 2004 for the role of the legendary Spanish wrestling hero "El Diablo" in Sandra Uve's film The Sexual Code (616 DF: El diablo español vs. Las luchadoras del este, 2004) and in 2006 for the role of ranger Miguel in the film Panic in the forest by Pepe Catman (Mantis: O Bosque do Tesão, 2006) starring Roberto Chivas and Max Cortés. Narcís Bosch hired him to produce IFGs such as Lágrimas de esperma (2001), Sex Meat (2001), Mundo salvaje de Max (2001), Ruta 69 (2001), Kryminalne tango (Crazy Bullets, 2003), Hot Rats (2003), Café diablo (2006) and El escándalo de la princesa del pueblo (2011). After appearing alongside Mick Blue in the Spanish production of Razorback (The Gift, 2006), he was awarded the statuette of Ninfa for the best Spanish film and the best Spanish screenplay (Roberto Valtueña), he collaborated with studios such as Vidéo Marc Dorcel, Mario Salieri Entertainment Group and Private Media Group.

Nomar participated in the feminist porn film Five Hot Stories for Her (2007), for which the director Erika Lust received an award at the 2005 Barcelona International Erotic Film Festival. In the drama Wasteland (2012) he appeared on the club scene.

From 1 to 4 October 2015 he participated in an erotic salon in Barcelona with artists such as Nacho Vidal, Steve Holmes, Erica Fontes, Tiffany Doll, Franceska Jaimes and Carolina Abril. In June 2018 he won the ranking of the Spanish website 20minutos.es Guapo (letra R), beating world famous men such as Rubén Cortada, Ryan Reynolds, Ryan Kelley, Ryan Guzman, Ricky Martin and Robert Lewandowski.

From 9 to 11 June 2017 he participated in El Salón Erotic de Madrid (SEMAD) in Madrid together with Silvia Rubí, Amirah Adara, Erica Fontes, Nacho Vidal and Carolina Abril.

On 8 October 2017, at the 25th edition of the Barcelona International Erotic Film Festival, Nomar received the award in the category "Best International Actor Saló Erotic de Barcelona (SEB)" with a T-shirt with the inscription "There is no consent to the sexual abuse of minors"(Abuso sexual infantil: STOP) protesting against pedophilia.

In December 2017 he was ninth in the ranking of "Favorite Porn Actor" (Mis Actores Porno Favoritos), announced by the Spanish portal 20minutos.es.

In May 2019, at the erotic pub The Secret Garden in Medellín, Colombia, Nomar held workshops on the adult film industry, organized by former journalist Amaranta Hank.

Nomar's career continued in Evil Angel, appearing in several productions: Rocco Never Dies - The End (1998) directed by Rocco Siffredi, a film directed in the Gonzo style. Christoph Clark - Christoph's Beautiful Girls 4 (2002) in a group scene, Euro Angels Hardball 17: Anal Savants in a gang bang scene with Sandra Romain, Beautiful Girls 4 (2002) and Euro Angels Hardball 17: Anal Savants (2002) and Kink productions. com - in sadomasochistic scenes such as submission, deep throat, rimming, female ejaculation, anal and vaginal fisting, gang bang, bukkake, spitting and slapping.

United States
After working in Europe for twelve years, in December 2010, due to the difficult economic situation in Spain, Nomar moved to Los Angeles. He began traveling with his friend Nacho Vidal to California, where he participated in gonzo productions such as Slutty & Sluttier 12 (2010) by Manuel Ferrara or Belladonna: Manhandled 4 (2011) with Belladonna, and also collaborated with American brands such as Wicked Pictures, Reality Kings, New Sensations, Digital Playground, Evil Angel, Brazzers, Hard X, Kink, Porndoe Premium or Elegant Angel.

Due to Nomar's Spanish accent, director Jordan Septo cast him in the role of the main protagonist Zorro, created by writer Johnston McCulley, who was based on the figure of the historic Californian outlaw Joaquín Murieta in his porn parody Zorro XXX: A Pleasure Dynasty Parody (2012). The cast also included Tommy Gunn (Don Rafael), Lacie James (Teresa), Gracie Glam (Elena), Vicki Chase (Lolita), Tasha Reign (Teresa), Jynx Maze (Selena), Brooklyn Lee (Maria), Tom Byron (Don Diego) and Alec Knight (Captain Love). The film won the NightMoves Award for Best Parody-Drama and was nominated for an AVN Award and an XBiz Award.

Joanna Angel cast him for the role of the monster in Burning Angel's Fuckenstein (2012) pastiche, for which he was nominated for an AVN Award in the category "Best Double Penetration Sex Scene" with James Deen and Joanna Angel. The film received the Industry AltPorn Award in the "Best Feature Video" category. He also acted as the neighbor in Masashi Kishimoto's Naruto shōnen manga parody - Comic Book Freaks and Cosplay Geeks (2015), directed by Joanna Angel with Annie Cruz and Wolf Hudson. In a parody of Arthur Miller's play The Crucible (The Crucible: Parody Gangbang, 2016), directed by Maitresse Madeline Marlowe, he played the character of a clergyman.

On 23 January 2016, at the Hard Rock Hotel & Casino in Las Vegas, he was nominated for nine AVN Awards in the categories: Favorite Pornstar, Best Boy / Girl Sex Scene, Best Double Penetration Sex Scene, Best Scene group sex, Performer of the year and the most scandalous sex scene. His favorite screenmates were Adriana Chechik, Bonnie Rotten and Dani Daniels.

He was named 6th on Adult Entertainment Broadcast Network's "Pornstars 2017" list, 8th on AEBN's "Summer 2019 Pornstars" and entered the "Golden Three" on AEBN's "2020 Pornstars" list.

Nomar was one of the stars of TheUpperFloor Evil & Hot Halloween Orgy (2017), which was nominated for the AltPorn Award for Best Gonzo Video. He also appeared in Axel Braun porn parodies: Deadpool (2018) as Punisher, Captain Marvel (2019) as Chrell and Black Widow (2021) as Taskmaster. In Joanna Angel's Evil Tiki Babes (2020), which won the AVN Award for best screenplay, he was a bartender at the Cannibal Cult club.

In 2020, Nomar presented his films on the OnlyFans social network, getting a large number of subscribers, starred alongside Rebel Lynn in the production of A Little R&R with Rebel & Ramon (2021). On 15 January 2021, he was honored at the 2021 Xbiz Awards in Los Angeles in the category "Artist of the Year". 

In 2021, he participated in a transsexual movie for the first time; the movie was an Evil Angel production Aubrey Kate Is Ramon Nomar’sNomar's First TS (2021), which he co-directed with Chris Streams. In 2021 he made his directorial debut in the Evil Angel production TransInternational: Los Angeles with Wolf Hudson and Joanna Angel, then he directed TransInternational: Las Vegas, starring Pierce Paris.

Other works
Starting at the age of sixteen, he became passionate about water sports such as surfing and spearfishing, used his additional funding for surf training, and participated in surfing competitions.

Nomar completed an acting course at the Stella Adler School in Los Angeles. His photos appeared in the American women's magazine Playgirl, in August 1999 for Suze Randall and in November 2000.

On 2 March 2015, at The Hollywood Roosevelt Hotel on Hollywood Boulevard, Hollywood, he was the star during the promotion of Patricia Velásquez's autobiographical book Straight Walk: A Supermodel’s Journey To Finding Her Truth. On 11 October 2016, Emily Witt's book Future Sex was published, in which he is also mentioned.

In the comedy Original Sin (2018) he acted as a news reporter.

Personal life 
On 11 January 2017, Nomar, along with porn film director Tony T., filed a lawsuit in the Los Angeles Supreme Court for defamation related to the allegations of porn star Nikki Benz, who on 20 December 2016, announced through social media that after the Brazzers session on Nikki Goes Bananas and the sex scene (since 19 December) she was sexually assaulted. Tony T. and Nomar maintain that the accusations were false.

Awards
 1998 Hot d'Or Award – Best New Actor
 2004 Ninfa Prize – Best Spanish Actor (616DF - El Diablo español vs las luchadoras del este)
 2006 Ninfa Prize – Best Spanish Actor (Mantis)
 2012 AVN Award – Best Group Sex Scene (Asa Akira Is Insatiable 2) with Asa Akira, Erik Everhard, Toni Ribas, Danny Mountain, Jon Jon, Broc Adams & John Strong
 2013 AVN Award – Best Double Penetration Sex Scene (Asa Akira Is Insatiable 3) with Asa Akira & Mick Blue
 2013 AVN Award – Best Group Sex Scene (Asa Akira Is Insatiable 3) with Asa Akira, Erik Everhard & Mick Blue
 2013 AVN Award – Best Three-Way Sex Scene (B/B/G) (Lexi) with Lexi Belle and Mick Blue
 2014 AVN Award – Best Three-Way Sex Scene (B/B/G) (Anikka) with Anikka Albrite and James Deen
 2015 AVN Award – Best Group Sex Scene (Gangbang Me) with A.J. Applegate, John Strong, Erik Everhard, Mr. Pete, Mick Blue, James Deen and Jon Jon
 2015 AVN Award – Best Three-Way Sex Scene (B/B/G) (Allie) with Allie Haze and Mick Blue

References

External links

 
 
 

1974 births
Living people
People from Caracas
Spanish male pornographic film actors
Venezuelan people of Spanish descent
Venezuelan people of Galician descent
Venezuelan pornographic film actors
OnlyFans creators